George Hasenohrl (March 10, 1951 – October 31, 2002) was an American football defensive tackle. He played for the New York Giants in 1974.

He died on October 31, 2002, in Maple Heights, Ohio at age 51.

References

1951 births
2002 deaths
American football defensive tackles
Ohio State Buckeyes football players
New York Giants players